Oenomaus moseri is a species of butterfly of the family Lycaenidae. It occurs in lowland and lower montane forest in southern Brazil.

The length of the forewings is 16.1 mm for males and 15.7 mm for females.

Etymology
The species is named for Alfred Moser, who lives in Rio Grande do Sul and has made prodigious contributions to the knowledge of Lepidoptera from southern Brazil, including co-authoring papers on the taxonomy of Oenomaus and Porthecla.

References

Insects described in 2012
Eumaeini
Lycaenidae of South America